Cambridge School, Srinivaspuri is a co-educational school with around 2000 students in New Delhi, India. It is run by the Society for Advancement of Education and is affiliated to CBSE. The school was founded in 1931. The school's first principal was the founder Shri A.C Deb. This particular branch of Cambridge School's foundation was laid by Indira Gandhi in 1961.

External links
 

Educational institutions established in 1931
Buildings and structures in New Delhi
High schools and secondary schools in Delhi
1931 establishments in India